Ololygon tupinamba is a species of frog in the family Hylidae. It is endemic to Brazil.

References

tupinamba
Endemic fauna of Brazil
Frogs of South America
Amphibians described in 2008